Ruth Martha Shady Solís (born December 29, 1946, Callao, Perú) is a Peruvian anthropologist and archaeologist. She is the founder and director of the archaeological project at Caral.

Career 
Throughout her career, she has directed many different projects of archeological investigation on the coast, the highlands and the rain forests of Peru, placing emphasis on the study of the development of the complex socio-political organizations. She was director of the Museo Nacional de Arqueología y Antropología del Perú (National Museum of Archaeology and Anthropology of Peru), and director of the Museum of Archeology and Anthropology of National University of San Marcos. She has worked at the Caral site from 1994 onwards and is credited with the discovery of Norte Chico, the first known civilization of the Americas, and one of the oldest in the world. Shady has named the civilization after Caral, while the term Norte Chico has been adopted in English.

In 2001, Shady and others published radiocarbon dates from the site of Caral in the Supe Valley of Peru, indicating that monumental corporate architecture, urban settlement, and irrigation agriculture began in the Americas by 4090 years before the present (2627 calibrated years B.C.) to 3640 years before the present (1977 calibrated years B.C.). Caral is one of 18 large preceramic sites in the Supe Valley.

Shady holds the offices of President of ICOMOS-PERU, principal professor and co-ordinator of the master of archeology graduate program faculty of social sciences of the University of San Marcos and director of the special archeological project Caral-Supe/INC.

Awards

Shady was on the list of the BBC's 100 Women announced on 23 November 2020.

References

External links
  
 Ruth Shady e Instituto de Salud del Niño obtienen Premios Campodónico 2007 June 15, 2007 (in Spanish)
 Ruth Shady - An open letter to Jonathan Haas and Winifred Creamer: http://caralperu.typepad.com/caral_civilization_peru/2005/01/open_letter_fro.html

1946 births
Living people
Peruvian archaeologists
Peruvian anthropologists
Peruvian women anthropologists
Peruvian people of British descent
National University of San Marcos alumni
Peruvian women archaeologists
BBC 100 Women
People from Callao
Andean scholars